The Independent Liberal Party is the name of more than one political party:

Independent Liberal Party (Chile)
Independent Liberal Party (Kosovo), a Serbian political party in Kosovo
Independent Liberal Party (Nicaragua), a Nicaraguan political party separated from Somoza's Nationalist Liberal Party (PLN) in 1944, and formed in 1947
Independent Liberal Party (Trinidad and Tobago)
Independent Liberals (Israel), a political party in Israel between the 1960s and 1980s
Independent Liberal Party (UK, 1918)
Independent Liberals (UK, 1931)

See also 
Liberal Party